Judo competitions at the 2011 Games of the Small States of Europe were held from 31 May to 2 June 2011.

Medal summary

Men's events

Women's events

Team events

Medal table

References

External links
 
 Judo Site of the 2011 Games of the Small States of Europe

European Games, Small States
2011 Games of the Small States of Europe
2011
Judo competitions in Liechtenstein